These are the official results of the Men's 10,000 metres event at the 1986 European Championships in Stuttgart, West Germany. The final was held at Neckarstadion on 26 August 1986.

Medalists

Final

Participation
According to an unofficial count, 24 athletes from 15 countries participated in the event.

 (1)
 (2)
 (1)
 (1)
 (2)
 (1)
 (3)
 (1)
 (1)
 (3)
 (1)
 (2)
 (1)
 (3)
 (1)

See also
 1982 Men's European Championships 10,000 metres (Athens)
 1983 Men's World Championships 10,000 metres (Helsinki)
 1984 Men's Olympic 10,000 metres (Los Angeles)
 1987 Men's World Championships 10,000 metres (Rome)
 1988 Men's Olympic 10,000 metres (Seoul)
 1990 Men's European Championships 10,000 metres (Split)

References

External links
 Results

10000
10,000 metres at the European Athletics Championships
Marathons in Germany